Rah Rah or rah-rah may refer to:
Rah Rah (band)
Rah-rah skirt
"Rah Rah", a 2005 song by Pitbull from Money Is Still a Major Issue

See also

RAH (disambiguation)
Rara (disambiguation)